Tandon (or Tandan, Tanden, or Tondon) is a surname found among Hindu Khatris and Sikhs of Punjab, India. It is derived from a Khatri clan.

Notable people
Notable people with the surname, who may or may not be affiliated to the clan/religion, include:

Activists 
Purushottam Das Tandon, Bharat Ratna, Indian freedom fighter

Actors 

Amit Tandon, Indian singer, television actor
Ayush Tandon, Indian actor who played "Pi" in Life of Pi
Kushal Tandon, Indian model, television actor
Raveena Tandon, Indian film actress
Sachet Tandon, Bollywood playback singer who has sung the song "Bekhayali"
Saumya Tandon, Indian television actress

Administrators 

 B. B. Tandon, IAS officer who served as 14th Chief Election Commissioner of India 
 Chandrika Tandon, businesswoman and vice chairman at NYU Tandon School of Engineering
 Gulshan Lal Tandon, former chairman of Coal India Limited
 Neera Tanden, American political consultant and staff secretary to President Joe Biden since 2021
 Prakash Tandon, former chairman at Hindustan Lever and author

Artists 

 Grace Martine Tandon, better known by her stage name Daya, American singer and song writer
 Loveleen Tandan, co-director of Slumdog Millionaire
 Lekh Tandon, Indian filmmaker 
 Ravi Tandon, film director and producer

Athletes 

 Ansh Tandon, Indo-Emirati international cricketer
 Rakesh Tandon, Indian cricketer
 Ramit Tandon, professional squash player who represents India. He was ranked number 46 in the world and India rank 2.
 Shikha Tandon, swimmer with 146 national medals, and 36 medals in international competitions, including five gold medals. Arjuna Award winner.

Entrepreneurs 

 Rakhee Kapoor Tandon, business entrepreneur and venture capitalist. She is one of "India’s 25 Most Influential Women", according to India Today.
 Sirjang Lal Tandon,  manufacturer of Tandon PC and disk drive, founder of Tandon Corporation

Politicians 

 Annu Tandon, MP in the 15th Lok Sabha from Unnao, Uttar Pradesh
 Ashutosh Tandon, Indian politician and currently serving as Minister of Urban Development, Urban Employment and Poverty Alleviation in the UP Government.
 Balram Das Tandon, Indian politician and the Former Governor of Chhattisgarh.
 Lalji Tandon, Indian politician who served as the Governor of Madhya Pradesh and Governor of Bihar. 
 Sanjay Tandon, Chandigarh State President of Bharatiya Janata Party 
 Yash Tandon, Indian-Ugandan policymaker, political activist, professor, author and public intellectual.

Scientists and doctors 

 Badri Nath Tandon, Indian gastroenterologist, hepatologist, medical researcher and academic
 Prakash Narain Tandon, Indian neuroscientist and neurosurgeon. Padma Bhushan awardee
 Pramod Tandon, Indian Plant Biotechnologist and academic.
Nina Tandon,  American biomedical engineer and tissue engineering researcher 
Rajesh Tandon, practitioner of participatory research and development. He is one of the founding fathers of Participatory Research. 
Sampat Kumar Tandon, Indian geologist. He is a former pro-vice chancellor at Delhi University 
Veena Tandon, Indian parasitologist, academic and a NASI senior scientist

References

Surnames
Indian surnames
Surnames of Indian origin
Punjabi-language surnames
Hindu surnames
Khatri clans
Khatri surnames